Guidi is an Italian surname shared by several notable people:

 Alessandro Pier Guidi (born 1983), racing driver from Italy
 Angela Maria Guidi Cingolani (1896–1991), Italian politician
 Antonio Guidi (1927–2013), Italian actor and voice actor
 Antonio Guidi (born 1945), Italian politician
 Carlo Alessandro Guidi (1650–1712), Italian lyric poet
 Chen Guidi (born 1942), Chinese writer from Huaiyuan county, Anhui
 Diego Guidi (born 1981), Argentine retired footballer
 Domenico Guidi (1625–1701), Italian sculptor
 Dominique Guidi (born 1996), French professional footballer 
 Donna Rachele Guidi (1890-1979), wife of Italian dictator Benito Mussolini
 Emanuele Guidi (born 1969), Sammarinese archer
 Fabrizio Guidi (born 1972), Italian cyclist
 Federica Guidi (born 1969), Italian businesswoman and the former Minister of Economic Development
 Gianluca Guidi (born 1968), Italian rugby union coach and former player
 Gina Guidi (born 1962), American professional female boxer
 Giovanni Francesco Guidi di Bagno, Italian cardinal, brother of cardinal Nicola and nephew of cardinal Colonna
 Giovanni di ser Giovanni Guidi (1406–1486), Italian painter, brother of Masaccio
 Guidarino Guidi (1922–2003), Italian film actor and director
 Guido Guidi (fl. 20th century), Italian comic book artist and penciller
 Guido Guidi (photographer) (born 1941), Italian photographer
 Guido Buffarini Guidi (1895–1945), Italian politician active during the Second World War
 Ignazio Guidi (1844–1935), Italian orientalist
 Jennifer Guidi (born 1972), American artist
 Juan Héctor Guidi (1930–1973), Argentine footballer
 Nicholas Guidi (born 1983), Italian football defender 
 Nicola Guidi di Bagno (1583-1663), titular archbishop of Atenia, bishop of Senigallia, and cardinal
 Osvaldo Guidi (1964–2011), Italian cinema, theater and television actor, and a dramaturge and theater director
 Peter Guidi (1949–2018), American jazz musician
 Scipione Guidi (1884–1966), Italian violinist
 Tommaso di Giovanni di Simone Guidi Masaccio (1401-1428), Italian leading painter 
 Virgilio Guidi (1891–1984), Italian artist and writer

See also
 Guidi (family)
 Guido
 Casa Guidi
 Cerreto Guidi, in the Metropolitan City of Florence 
 Poppi Castle

Italian-language surnames
Patronymic surnames
Surnames from given names